The Ensemble Jacques Moderne, directed by Joël Suhubiette, is a choir performing mainly the Renaissance and Baroque repertoire. It is located in Tours. The Ensemble was founded by Jean-Pierre Ouvrard in Tours in 1974, and has been directed by Joël Suhubiette since 1993.

Discography

Under the direction of Joël Suhubiette 
 François Regnard, Motets, Calliope, 1995 (8 Répertoire, 5 Diapason, 'CHOC' of Le Monde de la musique)
 Marco da Gagliano, Motets, Calliope, 1995 (8 Répertoire, 5 Diapasons, 4 stars Monde de la Musique)
 Clément Janequin, La Bataille de Marignan, Calliope, 1996
 Giovanni Bassano, Motets, Calliope, 1997 (Palmarès du Prix International Antonio Vivaldi de Venise (1997), 8 Répertoire, 5 Diapasons, 4 stars Monde de la Musique)
 Eustache Du Caurroy, Requiem, Calliope, 2000 (9 Répertoire, 4 Diapasons, 4 stars Goldberg)
 François Couperin, Messe des Paroisses, Olivier Vernet, Ligia, 2000 (6 Répertoire, 5 Diapasons, 4 stars Monde de la Musique, 4 stars Goldberg)
 Pierre Tabart, Requiem, Magnificat, Te Deum, Jean Tubéry, Virgin Veritas, 2001 (7 Répertoire, 5 Diapasons)
 Cristóbal de Morales, Francisco Guerrero, De Beata Virgine, Ligia, 2001 (8 Répertoire, 4 Diapasons, 5 Classica)
 Nicolas De Grigny, Livre d’orgue, Olivier Vernet, Ligia, 2003 (ffff Télérama, 9 Répertoire, 5 Diapasons, 4 Stars Monde de la Musique, exceptional record hifi-video)
 Giacomo Carissimi, Jephté, Jonas, Ligia, 2003 (7 de Répertoire, 5 Diapasons, 4 stars Monde de la Musique)
 Jean Mouton, Motets, Ligia, 2003 (5 Diapasons, 5 de Classica, Choc du Monde de la Musique, excellent record hifi-video)
 Dietrich Buxtehude, Jesu, meine Freude, Ligia, 2007 (5 Diapasons)
 Domenico Scarlatti, Stabat Mater - Messe de Madrid, Ligia, 2010 (Ring de ClassiqueInfo, 4 Diapasons, Muse d’or de Musebaroque.fr)

Under the direction of Jean-Pierre Ouvrard 
1989: Chants de la révolution française, (Book-cassette), Le Livre de Poche
1990: Francisco Guerrero, Motets et Missa de La Battalla Escoutez, Musica Nova
1991: Claude Lejeune, Motets Latins, Musica Nova
1992: Guillaume Boni, Motets, Musica Nova
2013: Josquin Desprez, Missa D'ung aultre amer, Missa Malheur me bat, (Book record), Posthumous

References

External links 
 Official website
 Ensemble Jacques Moderne on Discogs
 Ensemble Jacques Moderne on Fevis.com
 Festival Sinfonia en Périgord on YouTube
 Les 40 ans de l' Ensemble Jacques Moderne on France Musique

Jacques Moderne
Early music groups
Organizations based in Tours, France
Musical groups from Centre-Val de Loire